Steen Pade (born 1956) is a Danish composer. He studied composition with Ib Nørholm, Per Nørgård, and Karl Aage Rasmussen.

From 1992 to 2007 he was director (principal) of the Royal Danish Academy of Music.

External links
 Biography of Pade at naxos.com
 Article on Pade in Den Store Danske (in Danish)

Living people
1956 births
Danish classical composers
Danish male classical composers
20th-century classical composers
21st-century classical composers
Academic staff of the Royal Danish Academy of Music
Place of birth missing (living people)
Pupils of Per Nørgård
20th-century Danish male musicians
21st-century male musicians